Thomas Anthony John Youngs (born 31 August 1979) is an English football assistant manager and a former forward.

Career
Tom Youngs was first scouted by Cambridge United's academy as a youngster, although he had not been interested in the game until he was eight years old.

He played for Cambridge, Northampton, Leyton Orient, Bury, Stafford Rangers, and other clubs. As a Cambridge player, Youngs was the club's top scorer for two consecutive seasons, 2000 to 2002, netting in 26 goals.

In 2011, while playing for Mildenhall Town, Youngs was forced to retire from active play following a serious hip injury that he suffered during a game against Wisbech Town, which Mildenhall went on to win 9–0. He remained with the club as assistant manager.

Personal life
At school, Youngs got A Levels in English, Mathematics, and French. While an active footballer, he obtained a degree in Sports Journalism from Staffordshire University. Reportedly, his scholarly achievements inspired the chant, "Tom Youngs has got A Levels," while he was with Cambridge.

In 2015, Youngs was diagnosed with multiple sclerosis. In 2016, his autobiography was published.

Tom is married to Chelle Youngs and they have two daughters, Orla and Hannah.

See also
Danny Wallace
Ivaylo Yordanov

References

English footballers
1979 births
Living people
Sportspeople from Bury St Edmunds
Cambridge United F.C. players
Northampton Town F.C. players
Leyton Orient F.C. players
Bury F.C. players
Stafford Rangers F.C. players
Cambridge City F.C. players
Mildenhall Town F.C. players
Norwich United F.C. players
Association football forwards